Pinnacle Systems, Inc. is a California-based American manufacturer of digital video hardware and software for the mainstream and broadcast markets. The company was founded in 1986 by Ajay Chopra (CEO), Mirek Jiricka, and Randall Moore.

The company completed its IPO (NASDAQ: PCLE) in November 1994. In 1997 Pinnacle purchased Miro Computer Systems GmbH and in 2001 the video editing business of FAST MultiMedia AG. In 2002 Pinnacle purchased VOB Computersysteme GmbH. In 2003 Pinnacle purchased Steinberg, only to sell it off to Yamaha in 2004. Pinnacle was subsequently acquired by American company Avid Technology in August 2005.  Avid subsequently sold Pinnacle products to Corel Corporation in July 2012.

Products
Pinnacle products include:
Pinnacle Studio
Dazzle
VideoSpin (Windows)
Groovy Music City
Mobile Media Converter
Instant DVD Recorder
Video Capture for Mac
Avid Liquid

On-air graphics products now under Avid brand:
Deko character generators
MediaStream servers
Lightning still stores
Thunder video servers

Divested products:

PCTV (now owned by Hauppauge Digital)
TV for Mac (now owned by Hauppauge Digital)

Discontinued products:

SoundBridge
Profiler
TVCenter PRO
Video Transfer
PDS Video Switcher
ShowCenter
Miro Video DC10
Miro Video DC10plus
Miro Video DC30
Miro Video DC30plus
Pro-ONE
DC1000
DC2000
DV500

References

External links
Pinnacle Systems

Electronics companies established in 1986
Software companies established in 1986
Companies based in Mountain View, California
Electronics companies of the United States
Film and video technology
Graphics hardware companies
Software companies based in the San Francisco Bay Area
1986 establishments in California
Corel
2005 mergers and acquisitions
2012 mergers and acquisitions
American subsidiaries of foreign companies
Software companies of the United States
Computer companies of the United States